The Herzegovina-Neretva Canton (Serbian and ) is one of 10 cantons of the Federation of Bosnia and Herzegovina in Bosnia and Herzegovina.

The canton mainly comprises the Neretva river valley area and parts of Herzegovina west of Mostar, its administrative center. It is one of the 4 cantons in the country with a Croatian majority (53.29%), although in the case of this territory it is more ethnically divided and is considered to have a mixed population.

History 
Before the war in Bosnia and Herzegovina, the present-day municipalities of East Mostar and Berkovići were part of Mostar and Stolac, while Ivanica was part of the municipality of Trebinje.

The history of today's Herzegovina-Neretva Canton begins on March 18, 1994, with the signing of the Washington Agreement. The canton was officially constituted on December 23, 1996 as one of the ten cantons of the Federation of Bosnia and Herzegovina.

Geography 

The canton is the only canton in Bosnia and Herzegovina with access to the sea via the municipality of Neum. Neum is a town of 2,000 citizens (1991 census) and the area around the city is rich with historical and archeological remains of the Illyrians, a people who lived in the Balkans for many thousands of years.

The largest city in the canton and the fifth largest city in the country is Mostar. Mostar is located on the banks of the Neretva river and is divided between Croats and Bosniaks. Mostar is known for its old bridge, Stari Most, which was constructed by the area's Ottoman rulers, who also brought Islam to the region. Bosnian Croat forces bombed and destroyed the bridge on November 8, 1993. Upon its destruction it had stood for 427 years and had become a symbol of a shared cultural heritage and "peaceful" co-existence. The bridge was reconstructed in the summer of 2004. The opening ceremony was attended by several foreign delegates including Stjepan Mesić, the President of Croatia.

Other notable cities in this canton are Čapljina, Konjic, Jablanica and Međugorje, the most significant Marian shrine in the region. Jablanica and Konjic are notable for battles which took place there during World War II and there is a large museum in Jablanica dedicated to these battles.

The Neretva river runs through the cities of Konjic, Jablanica, Mostar and Čapljina before it flows through Croatia and into the Adriatic Sea. There are large lakes in the canton such as the Jablanica lake located around the city Jablanica. The southernmost municipality in the canton is the Neum municipality which borders the Adriatic sea and the easternmost municipality is the Ravno municipality along the border with Croatia.

Municipalities
The canton is split into the municipalities of

 Čapljina, 
 Čitluk, 
 Jablanica, 
 Konjic, 
 Mostar, 
 Neum, 
 Prozor-Rama, 
 Ravno 
 and Stolac.

Demographics
Of the ten cantons comprising the Federation of Bosnia Herzegovina, Herzegovina-Neretva Canton is one of two cantons, the other being the Central Bosnia Canton, nearly equally populated by Bosniaks and Croats. In such cantons there are special legislative procedures for the protection of the constituent ethnic groups.

Croats form a majority in the municipalities of Čapljina, Čitluk, Neum, Prozor-Rama and Ravno, and a relative majority in Stolac and Mostar according to the 2013 census. Bosniaks form an absolute majority in the municipalities of Jablanica and Konjic.

2013 Census

Politics and government 
According to the current law, the Herzegovina-Neretva Canton is one of the ten cantons of the Federation of Bosnia and Herzegovina, which is one of the two entities of Bosnia and Herzegovina.

The Herzegovina-Neretva Canton has its own legislative, executive and judicial powers. Like each of the cantons of FBiH, it has its own constitution, assembly, government, symbols and has a number of exclusive competences (police, education, use of natural resources, spatial and housing policy, culture), while some competences are divided. between cantonal and federal authorities (health, social protection, transport).

The citizens of the canton of Herzegovina-Neretva vote for a total of 30 representatives in the Cantonal Assembly every four years in general elections. Based on the results of the 2014 general elections, the current HNK government is formed by a coalition between the Party of Democratic Action (SDA) and the Croatian Democratic Union of Bosnia and Herzegovina (HDZ BiH).

At the local level, citizens of Herzegovina-Neretva Canton vote every four years in municipal elections for local government in two cities and seven other municipalities.

Economy 
The strongest industries by number of employees in Herzegovina-Neretva Canton (as of August 2017) are wholesale and retail trade, manufacturing, and hotels and restaurants. The economic headquarters of the canton is its capital, Mostar.

Industry 
After the tertiary sector, the manufacturing sector is the strongest sector of the economy of the Herzegovina-Neretva Canton. The strongest branches of this sector are the processing industry and electricity production.

The manufacturing industry has a total of 6,798 employees (August 2017). The strongest industries are military (e.g. Igman in Konjic), metal processing industry (e.g. Aluminij in Mostar) and food industry (e.g. Hepok in Mostar).

Electricity generation is also an important industry, this is carried out in the mainly in hydroelectric power plants on the Neretva River and its tributaries, which are mostly owned by Elektroprivreda HZHB (most of the electricity produced comes from these hydroelectric power plants).

Tourism 

The canton of Herzegovina-Neretva, with its nature parks and numerous natural beauties, has great tourism potential. According to the Federal Statistical Office, in 2014 the canton was visited by 104,006 foreign tourists and 208,647 overnight stays were made. The biggest tourist attractions in the region are the old town of Mostar, Blagaj near Mostar, Medjugorje and Neum (Bosnia and Herzegovina's only outlet to the sea).

Transportation

Roads 
The following main roads and highways pass through the canton of Herzegovina-Neretva:

 From west to east: Main road M2 (Klek-Zaton Doli), M6 (Grude-Trebinje) and M6.1 (Resanovci-Gacko).
 From south to north: highway A1 (Svilaj-Bijača), main road M17 (Bosanski Šamac-Čapljina) and M17.3 (Čapljina-Neum).

The total length of roads in the canton of Herzegovina-Neretva is 362.68 kilometers.

Railroad 
The Ploče-Sarajevo railroad passes through the Herzegovina-Neretva Canton, to which Konjic, Mostar, Jablanica and Čapljina are connected. The length of the railroad in the region is 126.2 kilometers, while the total number of railway stations and stops is 28, three of which are connected to the high-speed rail network.

Air traffic 
Mostar International Airport (OMO) is the third busiest airport in Bosnia and Herzegovina after Sarajevo and Tuzla airports, with a total of 53,618 passengers (2016).

Education 

There are a total of 33 secondary schools (28 state and five private) and numerous elementary schools in Herzegovina-Neretva Canton. There are a total of three universities in this canton:

 University of Mostar with 14,000 students and ten faculties.
 University Džemal Bijedić of Mostar with 3,000 students and eight faculties.
 Private university "Herzegovina" in Medjugorje and Mostar with two faculties.

See also 
List of heads of the Herzegovina-Neretva Canton

References

 
Cantons of the Federation of Bosnia and Herzegovina